The 1985 BYU Cougars football team represented Brigham Young University during the 1985 NCAA Division I-A football season. The Cougars were led by 14th-year head coach LaVell Edwards and played their home games at Cougar Stadium in Provo, Utah. The team competed as a member of the Western Athletic Conference, winning a share of their 10th consecutive conference title  with a conference record of 7–1, sharing the title with Air Force. BYU was invited to the 1985 Florida Citrus Bowl, where they lost to Ohio State. The Cougars were ranked 16th in the final AP Poll with an overall record of 11–3.

Schedule

Personnel

Season summary

Air Force

Robbie Bosco wore number 7 in honor of injured teammate Glen Kozlowski

References

BYU
BYU Cougars football seasons
Western Athletic Conference football champion seasons
BYU Cougars football